Al-Hamra, was a Palestinian Arab village in the District of Baysan. It was located 7.5 kilometres south of Baysan. It was depopulated by the Israeli Army during the 1948 Arab-Israeli War. The village was named after the Bedouin tribe who settled in the village lands centuries ago. The population in 1945 was 730, expanding to 847 in 1948.

In 1945 the village's total land area was recorded as 11,511 dunams, 8,623 of which was Arab owned while 2,153 duname were owned by Jews with the remainder being public property. Al-Hamra was situated 175 meters below sea level.

History
There are archaeological sites located just east of the village that are traced back to the era of the Canaanites, particularly the tells of Abu Kharaj and al-Shuqaf.

Al-Hamra receives its name from the al-Hamra clan, a branch of the al-Suqur ("the Falcons") tribe. According to Walid Khalidi, the al-Hamra clan settled in the area several centuries ago because of its abundant water supplies and fertile soil. The first reference to the village was in 1281 when Qalawun, the Bahri Mamluk sultan, traveled through it on his way to Egypt from Syria. During the rule of Sanjar al-Jawli (Governor of Gaza and much of Palestine from 1311-20 and 1329) he ordered the construction of Khan Salar, a caravansary named after his friend, the former viceroy of the sultanate Emir Salar.

British Mandate era
During the beginning of the 20th-century, al-Hamra's homes were widely scattered and were either permanent adobe brick structures or camel-hair tents. The village's main crops were grain, oranges, olives and vegetables. 

In the 1945 statistics,  in the British Mandate era, Al-Hamra had a population of 730 Muslims and the total land area was  11,511 dunums. Of this, Arabs used 32 dunams for irrigated areas and plantations,  8,427 was used for cereals, while 733 dunams were uncultivable.

1948, aftermath
No visible structures remained in the village since its depopulation by Israeli forces in 1948. Trees, including fig groves, cacti and grass covered the site when Khalidi visited in the early 1990s.

References

Bibliography

External links
Welcome To al-Hamra
al-Hamra (Baysan), Zochrot,
Survey of Western Palestine Map 9:    IAA, Wikimedia commons

Arab villages depopulated during the 1948 Arab–Israeli War
Bedouin groups
Palestinian bedouins